Eschatura is a genus of moths of the family Xyloryctidae.

Species
 Eschatura lactea (Turner, 1898)
 Eschatura lemurias Meyrick, 1897

References

Xyloryctidae
Xyloryctidae genera